Vangaveeti Mohana Ranga Rao (4 July 1947 – 26 December 1988)  was an Indian politician from Andhra Pradesh. He worked as an MLA of Vijayawada East (Assembly constituency) legislative assembly as member of Indian National Congress party.

Ranga's elder brother, Vangaveeti Radha Krishna Rao Sr., was associated with Chalasani Venkata Rathnam, secretary of the Communist Party of India, Vijayawada. However, conflicts arose between Venkata Rathnam and Vangaveeti Radha, to get a hold on Vijayawada transport business, dominated by Datti Kanaka Rao, a follower of Chalasani Venkata Rathnam.

In 1972, both Kanaka Rao, and Venkata Rathnam were allegedly murdered by Vangaveeti Radha's supporters. These events in turn led to a retaliation by a rival group, ending in the murder of Vangaveeti Radha. Upon the death of Vangaveeti Radha, his brother Mohana Ranga took over the leadership of United independent Organization with the support of student union leaders Devineni Chandrasekhar (Gandhi), and Devineni Rajasekhar (Nehru).

The power struggle between the politically powerful Mohana Ranga and the Devineni family led to the splitting of the United Independent Organization and to the alleged protracted murders of brothers Devineni Chandrasekhar (Gandhi) in 1979 and Devineni Murali in 1988
. Subsequently, while Ranga was staging an indefinite fast for distribution of land pattas to residents of Giripuram, he was attacked by a group of men allegedly led by Devineni Rajasekhar (Nehru), who attacked Mohana Ranga's camp and assassinated him in the early hours of 26 December 1988. Ranga's two assigned bodyguards did not intervene. The murder led to large-scale riots in Krishna, Guntur and the Godavari districts.

Personal life
Mohana Ranga was born in Katuru near Vuyyuru, located in the Krishna district of Andhra Pradesh on 4 July 1947. His parents are Vangaveeti seetharamaya, and vangaveeti savithramma.He had four elder brothers: Vangaveeti Koteswara Rao,(expired at early age)
Vangaveeti Venkata Narayana Rao, (Apsrtc employee)
Vangaveeti Sobhana Chalapathi Rao,(ex MLA vuyyuru in 1989)
and Vangaveeti Radha Krishna Rao Sr.popularly known as bus stand radha, who was murdered in 1974. Mohana Ranga was married to Chennupati Ratna Kumari; they had a son Radha Krishna Rao Jr., named after Ranga's brother Vangaveeti Radha Krishna Rao Sr., and a daughter, Vangaveeti Asha Latha.

Political career
Vangaveeti Ranga entered public life after the death of his brother Vangaveeti Radha Krishna. His political career began in 1981, when he ran in the municipal election and the Congress Party withdrew its official candidate in his favor. His rival in the district, Devineni Rajasekhar, (Nehru), was sponsored by the Telugu Desam Party (TDP), while Ranga became a leader of the Kapu community. Ranga became an MLA for the Congress Party in 1985; Rajasekhar became a TDP MLA, and eventually a minister. Starting in 1983 both parties were implicated in gang warfare; N. T. Rama Rao was at the time the Chief Minister of Andhra Pradesh. The gang warfare in Vijayawada dated further back; Ranga had served time in prison for the murder of Rajasekhar's brother Gandhi. On 10 March 1988, Rajasekhar's brother Murali was killed, and followers of Ranga were accused. Ranga also campaigned against police abuse. On 10 July 1988, a rally called Kapunadu proclaimed him leader of the Kapus; he was in prison at the time, but after his release later that month began a bus tour called Jana Chaitanya Yatra "to expose the autocratic rule and misdeeds of Rama Rao". Rao had come to power after a van tour.

Riots
Following his death, there were riots throughout the region. The pattern of violence showed that the houses and property of Telugu Desam sympathisers who were mostly Kammas were attacked. The city of Vijayawada was under curfew for 40 days. 42 people were killed. Devineni Rajasekhar (Nehru) was ordered by the Chief Minister to surrender himself, and the Director-General of Police resigned. 44 people were accused of the crime; in 2002, the 33 who had not died in the meantime were all acquitted. One of them, Chalasani Venkateswara Rao, known as Pandu, was murdered in 2010.

Successors
Mohana Ranga's widow Ratna Kumari was elected MLA in 1989; in her second term, she switched from the Congress Party to the TDP. Radha Krishna also entered politics after his father's death. He was a Congress Party MLA from 2004 to 2009; later he shifted to the Praja Rajyam Party (PRP) then to the YSR Congress Party in 2012, and then to TDP in 2019.

In popular culture

Gaayam 2, a 2010 sequel to Gaayam, directed by Praveen Sri
Bejawada, a 2011 action film directed by Vivek Krishna
Vangaveeti, 2016 biographical film based on Vijayawada Gang Warfare, directed by Ram Gopal Varma

References 

1947 births
1988 deaths
1988 murders in Asia
Andhra Pradesh MLAs 1985–1989
Assassinated Indian politicians
Indian National Congress politicians from Andhra Pradesh
Male murder victims
People murdered in Andhra Pradesh
Politicians from Vijayawada